Timothy Hallinan (born April 28, 1945) is an American politician and a Republican member of the Wyoming House of Representatives for District 32 for the term starting January 10, 2017.

Career
Hallinan is a retired physician who previously served in the Wyoming House of Representatives from 2007 until 2011.

Elections

2016
After incumbent Republican Representative Norine Kasperik announced her retirement, Hallinan declared his candidacy for the seat. He faced Republicans Don Dihle, Jarik Dudley, and Grant Lindblom in the primary. Hallinan won the primary with 42% of the vote. He ran unopposed in the general election.

References

External links
Profile from Ballotpedia

Living people
Republican Party members of the Wyoming House of Representatives
People from Gillette, Wyoming
Stanford University alumni
University of Utah alumni
1945 births
21st-century American politicians